William C. Hill (May 10, 1917 – May 28, 1998) was a Vermont attorney and judge.  His most notable service came as an associate justice of the Vermont Supreme Court from 1976 to 1987.

Early life
William Charles Hill was born in Newark, New Jersey on May 10, 1917, the son of William Herbert Hill and Alice Anna (DeGroot) Hill.  He was raised and educated in Irvington, New Jersey, and graduated from Irvington High School.  He received his Bachelor of Arts degree from New York University in 1939, and in 1941 he received his J.D. from New York University Law School.  After admission to the bar, Hill practiced in New York City.

Military service
Hill joined the United States Army for World War II.  He enlisted in 1942, and received his commission as a second lieutenant after completing the Army Administration School's officer training program at North Dakota Agricultural College in Fargo.  Hill served in the European Theater of Operations and at the 1st Service Command in Boston as a member of the U.S. Army Claims Service, the agency responsible for adjudicating and resolving incidents of damage or destruction to civilian property.  He was a captain when he was discharged in 1946, and he remained in uniform as a member of the United States Army Reserve.  Hill was a member of the Judge Advocate General's Corps, and attained the rank of lieutenant colonel before retiring.

Early career
Hill moved to Vermont in 1946, and lived in Hinesburg and Shelburne while practicing law in Burlington.  In the late 1940s and early 1950s, Hill acted as judge of the Burlington municipal court during the judge's absence.  In 1950, he was an unsuccessful candidate for the Republican nomination to represent Hinesburg in the Vermont House of Representatives.  Hill was elected in 1952, reelected in 1954 and 1956, and served from 1953 to 1959.  In 1959, he was appointed a judge of the Vermont Superior Court.  He served until 1976, and was the court's chief judge beginning in 1972.  In 1968, Hill received a Master of Arts degree in history from the University of Vermont.

Vermont Supreme Court
In 1976, Hill was appointed an associate justice of the Vermont Supreme Court, succeeding Milford K. Smith.  He served until retiring in 1987, and was succeeded by John Dooley.

Controversy

During his Supreme Court tenure, Hill was involved in allegations of misconduct.  In 1986 and 1987, Hill and two other justices, Ernest W. Gibson III and Thomas L. Hayes, were accused of tailoring decisions to suit the wishes of an assistant judge in Chittenden County, and helping her cover up pay padding; the assistant judge, Jane Wheel, was supposed to be wielding undue influence over the justices.  Hayes died before the charges could be resolved, and charges against Gibson were dropped.  Wheel was convicted on charges arising from the case.  Hill was found to have violated rules regarding judicial conduct, and opted to retire at the end of his second six-year term, rather than applying to remain on the court until age 70, Vermont's mandatory retirement age for judges.

Other activities
Hill was a visiting professor of history at Burlington's Trinity College, and a lecturer on trial advocacy at Franklin Pierce Law Center in Concord, New Hampshire.

An accomplished saxophone and clarinet player, Hill played in both the Shelburne Town Band and the Burlington Concert Band.  He was also a beekeeper and a certified master gardener.

In 1992, Hill published The Vermont State Constitution: A Reference Guide, a work on the document's history and interpretation.

Death and burial
Hill died at his home in Shelburne, Vermont from the effects of lung cancer on May 28, 1998.  He was buried at Shelburne Village Cemetery in Shelburne.

Family
In 1942, Hill married Grace Giarratano (1919-2008).  She was a graduate of Hunter College and the University of Vermont, and taught in several Chittenden County school systems.  They were the parents of daughters Toni, Pamela, and Elizabeth.

References

Sources

Newspapers

Books

Magazines

External links

1917 births
1998 deaths
Irvington High School (New Jersey) alumni
People from Irvington, New Jersey
Politicians from Newark, New Jersey
New York University alumni
New York University School of Law alumni
University of Vermont alumni
United States Army personnel of World War II
United States Army reservists
Vermont lawyers
Republican Party members of the Vermont House of Representatives
Justices of the Vermont Supreme Court
Burials in Vermont
20th-century American politicians
20th-century American judges
20th-century American lawyers
University of New Hampshire faculty